Range may refer to:

Geography 
 Range (geographic), a chain of hills or mountains; a somewhat linear, complex mountainous or hilly area (cordillera, sierra) 
 Mountain range, a group of mountains bordered by lowlands
 Range, a term used to identify a survey township in the US
 Rangeland, deserts, grasslands, shrublands, wetlands, and woodlands that are grazed by domestic livestock or wild animals

Mathematics 
 Range of a function, a set containing the output values produced by a function
 Range (statistics), the difference between the highest and the lowest values in a set
 Interval (mathematics), also called range, a set of real numbers that includes all numbers between any two numbers in the set
 Column space, also called the range of a matrix, is the set of all possible linear combinations of the column vectors of the matrix
 Projective range, a line or a conic in projective geometry
 Range of a quantifier, in logic

Music 
 Range (music), the distance from the lowest to the highest pitch musical instruments can play
 Vocal range, the breadth of pitches that a human voice can phonate

People 
 Erik Range (born 1977), German computer games developer, journalist and YouTube personality
 Harald Range (1948–2018), Attorney General of Germany
 Heidi Range (born 1983), British singer and songwriter
 M. Athalie Range (1915–2006), American civil rights activist and politician
 Rosslyn Range (born 1933),  American long jumper

Places 

 Range, Alabama, an unincorporated community
 Range, Ohio, an unincorporated community
 Range, Wisconsin, an unincorporated community

Science 
 Range (biology), the geographical area where a species can be found
 Range (particle radiation), the distance a charged particle travels before stopping

Technology 
 Range (aeronautics), the distance an aircraft can fly
 Range (computer programming), the set of allowed values for a variable
 Range, any kitchen stove with multiple burners, especially in the United States
 All-electric range, the driving range of a vehicle using only power from its electric battery pack
 Range of a projectile, the potential distance a projectile can be hurled by a firearm or cannon
 Slant range, distance between two objects on different levels

Other uses 
 Range, in navigational transit, is a pair of navigational beacons whose line indicates a channel; if lighted, they are called
 Range lights (in the US), or leading lights (in the UK)
 Range, a term used by architectural historians to describe a long building or row of buildings, e.g., in a monastery
 An open stretch of land used for projectile testing
 Bombing range, a military test and training facility used by combat aircraft to practise attacking ground targets.
 Driving range, an area where golfers can practice their swing
 Shooting range, a controlled environment where ranged weapons are discharged at targets
 Range anxiety, the fear that a vehicle has insufficient range to reach its destination and would thus strand the vehicle's occupants
 Range factor (commonly abbreviated RF), a baseball statistic
 Rocket engine test facility, also known as a rocket test range
 Range: Why Generalists Triumph in a Specialized World, 2019 book by David Epstein

See also 
 Rangefinder
 Ranger (disambiguation)
 The Range (disambiguation)